Esther Weber (born 1967) is a German wheelchair fencer. She won gold at the 1992 Paralympics in the Épée and bronze in the foil.

Weber won a number of titles in wheelchair fencing both at the Paralympics and World Championships between 1990 and 2002. A school in Emmendingen for children with disabilities was named Esther-Weber-Schule after her in 2008.

Referencecs

1967 births
Living people
Paralympic wheelchair fencers of Germany
German female fencers